Til It Kills is the second studio album by California punk rock band, Tilt. It was released in April 1995 on Fat Wreck Chords.

Track listing

Personnel
 Cinder Block – vocals
 Jeffrey Bischoff – guitar
 Gabe Meline – bass
 Vincent Camacho – drums

Additional Personnel
 Produced by Kevin Army

References

External links
Fat Wreck Chords album page

1995 albums
Tilt (band) albums
Fat Wreck Chords albums